Robert George "Joe" Meek (5 April 1929 – 3 February 1967) was an English record producer, sound engineer and songwriter who pioneered space age and experimental pop music. He also assisted in the development of recording practices like overdubbing, sampling and reverberation. Meek is considered one of the most influential sound engineers of all time, being one of the first to develop ideas such as the recording studio as an instrument, and becoming one of the first producers to be recognised for his individual identity as an artist.

Charting singles Meek produced for other artists include "Johnny Remember Me" (John Leyton, 1961), "Just Like Eddie" (Heinz, 1963), "Angela Jones" (Michael Cox, 1960), "Have I the Right?" (the Honeycombs, 1964), and "Tribute to Buddy Holly" (Mike Berry, 1961). The Tornados' instrumental "Telstar" (1962), written and produced by Meek, became the first record by a British rock group to reach number one in the US Hot 100. It also spent five weeks at number one in the UK singles chart, with Meek receiving an Ivor Novello Award for this production as the "Best-Selling A-Side" of 1962. He also produced music for films such as Live It Up! (US title Sing and Swing, 1963), a pop music film.  Meek's concept album I Hear a New World (1960), which contains innovative use of electronic sounds, was not fully released in his lifetime.

His reputation for experiments in recording music was acknowledged by the Music Producers Guild who in 2009 created "The Joe Meek Award for Innovation in Production" as a "homage to [the] remarkable producer's pioneering spirit". In 2014, Meek was ranked the greatest producer of all time by NME, elaborating: "Meek was a complete trailblazer, attempting endless new ideas in his search for the perfect sound. ... The legacy of his endless experimentation is writ large over most of your favourite music today."

At the time of his death, Meek possessed thousands of unreleased recordings later dubbed "The Tea Chest Tapes". His commercial success as a producer was short-lived, and he gradually sank into debt and depression. On 3 February 1967, using a shotgun owned by musician Heinz Burt, Meek killed his landlady, Violet Shenton, and then shot himself.

Biography

Childhood and early careers
Meek was born at 1 Market Square, Newent, Gloucestershire, and developed an interest in electronics and performance art at a very early age, filling his parents' garden shed with begged and borrowed electronic components, building circuits, radios and what is believed to be the region's first working television. During his national service in the Royal Air Force, he worked as a radar technician which increased his interest in electronics and outer space. From 1953 he worked for the Midlands Electricity Board. He used the resources of the company to develop his interest in electronics and music production, including acquiring a disc cutter and producing his first record.

He left the electricity board to work as an audio engineer for a leading independent radio production company which made programmes for Radio Luxembourg, and made his breakthrough with his work on Ivy Benson's Music for Lonely Lovers. His technical ingenuity was first shown on the Humphrey Lyttelton jazz single "Bad Penny Blues" (Parlophone Records, 1956) when, contrary to Lyttelton's wishes, Meek modified the sound of the piano and compressed the sound to a greater than normal extent. The record became a hit. He then put enormous effort into Denis Preston's Landsdowne Studio but tensions between Preston and Meek soon saw Meek leaving. During his time he recorded US actor George Chakiris for SAGA Records and it was this that led him to Major Wilfred Alonzo Banks and an independent career. He also engineered many jazz and calypso records including vocalist and percussionist Frank Holder and band leader Kenny Graham.

Meek was also working as a songwriter at this time, using the name "Robert Duke".  After being initially released by Eddie Silver and later by Tommy Steele, the Duke composition "Put A Ring On My Finger" was recorded by Les Paul & Mary Ford in 1958, and reached #32 on the US charts.

In January 1960, together with William Barrington-Coupe, Meek founded Triumph Records. At the time Barrington-Coupe was working at SAGA records in Empire Yard, Holloway Road for Major Wilfred Alonzo Banks and it was the Major who provided the finance. The label very nearly had a No.1 hit with Meek's production of "Angela Jones" by Michael Cox. Cox was one of the featured singers on Jack Good's TV music show Boy Meets Girls and the song was given massive promotion. As an independent label, Triumph was dependent on small pressing plants, which were unable to meet the demand for product. The record made a respectable appearance in the Top Ten, but it demonstrated that Meek needed the distribution network of the major companies for his records to reach retail outlets.
  
Its indifferent business results and Meek's temperament eventually led to the label's demise. Meek later licensed many Triumph recordings to labels such as Top Rank and Pye. That year Meek conceived, wrote and produced an "Outer Space Music Fantasy" album titled I Hear a New World with a band called Rod Freeman & the Blue Men. The album was shelved for decades, apart from the release of some EP tracks taken from it.

304 Holloway Road

Meek went on to set up his own production company known as RGM Sound Ltd (later Meeksville Sound Ltd) with toy importer Major Wilfred Alonzo Banks as his financial backer. He operated from his home studio which he constructed at 304 Holloway Road, Islington, a three-floor flat above a leather-goods store.

His first hit from Holloway Road reached No.1 in the UK: John Leyton's "Johnny Remember Me" (1961) written by Geoff Goddard. This "death ditty" was cleverly promoted by Leyton's manager, expatriate Australian entrepreneur Robert Stigwood. Stigwood was able to gain Leyton a booking to perform the song several times in an episode of Harpers West One, a short-lived ITV soap opera in which he was making a guest appearance. Meek's third UK No.1 and last major success was with the Honeycombs' "Have I the Right?" in 1964, written by Ken Howard and Alan Blaikley.  The Meek-produced track which also became a number 5 hit on the American Billboard pop charts. The success of these recordings was instrumental in establishing Stigwood and Meek as two of Britain's first independent record producers.

When his landlords, who lived downstairs, felt that the noise was too much, they would indicate so with a broom on the ceiling. Meek would signal his contempt by placing loudspeakers in the stairwell and turning up the volume.

A privately manufactured "black plaque" (designed to resemble the official blue plaque) has since been placed at the location of the studio to commemorate Meek's life and work.

Meek heard many up and coming bands and artists over his career, some of which he did not see any potential for. After Brian Epstein asked his opinion of the Beatles' demo tape, Meek told him not to bother signing them. On another occasion he signed a band on the condition that they get rid of their lead singer: a 16-year-old Rod Stewart.

Personal life
Meek became fascinated with the idea of communicating with the dead. He would set up tape machines in graveyards in an attempt to record voices from beyond the grave, in one instance capturing the meows of a cat he believed was speaking in human tones, asking for help. In particular, he had an obsession with Buddy Holly (saying the late American rocker had communicated with him in dreams). By the end of his career, Meek's fascination with these topics had taken over his life following the deterioration in his mental health, and he started to believe that his flat contained poltergeists, that aliens were substituting his speech by controlling his mind, and that photographs in his studio were trying to communicate with him.

Meek was affected by bipolar disorder and schizophrenia, and, upon receiving an apparently innocent phone call from American record producer Phil Spector, Meek immediately accused Spector of stealing his ideas before hanging up angrily. His professional efforts were often hindered by his paranoia (Meek was convinced that Decca Records would put hidden microphones behind his wallpaper to steal his ideas), depression, and extreme mood swings. In later years, Meek started experiencing psychotic delusions, culminating in his refusal to use the studio telephone for important communications due to his belief that his landlady was eavesdropping on his calls through the chimney, that he could control the minds of others with his recording equipment, and that he could monitor his acts while away from the studio through supernatural means.

Meek was also a frequent recreational drug user, with his barbiturate abuse further worsening his depressive episodes. In addition, his heavy consumption of amphetamines caused him to fly into volatile rages with little or no provocation, at one point leading him to hold a gun to the head of drummer Mitch Mitchell to 'inspire' a high-quality performance.

Meek's homosexuality – at a time when homosexual acts were illegal in the UK – put him under further pressure and he was particularly afraid that his mother would find out about his sexual orientation. In 1963 he was convicted and fined £15 for "importuning for immoral purposes" in a London public toilet, and was consequently subject to blackmail. In January 1967, police in Tattingstone, Suffolk, discovered two suitcases containing the remains of Bernard Oliver. According to some accounts, Meek was afraid of being questioned by the Metropolitan Police, as it was known they were intending to interview all of the gay men in London. This was enough for him to lose his self-control.

Meek always walked everywhere outside the studio wearing sunglasses, fearing recognition by local gangsters such as the Kray twins, who he feared would attempt to steal his acts or blackmail him regarding his homosexuality.

Meek's depression deepened as his financial position became increasingly desperate. French composer Jean Ledrut accused him of plagiarism, claiming that the melody of "Telstar" had been copied from "La Marche d'Austerlitz", a piece from a score Ledrut had written for the film Austerlitz (1960). The lawsuit meant that Meek did not receive royalties from the record during his lifetime, and the issue was not resolved in his favour until three weeks after his death in 1967.

Murder and suicide

On 3 February 1967,  Meek killed his landlady Violet Shenton and then himself with a single-barrelled shotgun that he had confiscated from his protégé, former Tornados bassist and solo star Heinz Burt, at his Holloway Road home/studio. Meek and Shenton argued over his noise levels and the rent that he still owed before Meek picked up the shotgun. He had taken the gun from Burt when he informed Meek that he had used it, while on tour, to shoot birds. Meek had kept the gun under his bed, along with some cartridges. As the shotgun had been owned by Burt, he was questioned intensively by police before being eliminated from their enquiries. Meek was buried at Newent Cemetery, Newent, Gloucestershire.

Legacy

Recording
Meek's inability to play a musical instrument or write notation did not prevent him writing and producing successful commercial recordings. For songwriting, he was reliant on musicians such as Dave Adams, Geoff Goddard or Charles Blackwell to transcribe melodies from his vocal "demos". He worked on 245 singles, 45 of which reached the top fifty. He pioneered studio tools such as multiple over-dubbing on one- and two-track machines, close miking, direct input of bass guitars, the compressor, and effects like echo and reverb, as well as sampling. Unlike other producers, his search was for the 'right' sound rather than for a catchy musical tune, and throughout his brief career he single-mindedly followed his quest to create a unique "sonic signature" for every record he produced.

At a time when many studio engineers were still wearing white coats and assiduously trying to maintain clarity and fidelity, Meek was producing everything on the three floors of his "home" studio and was never afraid to distort or manipulate the sound if it created the effect he was seeking.

Meek was one of the first producers to grasp and fully exploit the possibilities of the modern recording studio. His innovative techniques — physically separating instruments, treating instruments and voices with echo and reverb, processing the sound through his fabled home-made electronic devices, the combining of separately recorded performances and segments into a painstakingly constructed composite recording – constituted major breakthroughs in sound production. Up to that time, the standard technique for pop recording was to record all the performers in one studio, playing together in real time. This was substantially different from that of his contemporary Phil Spector, who typically created his "Wall of Sound" productions by making live recordings of large ensembles that used multiples of major instruments like bass, guitar, and piano to create the complex sonic backgrounds for his singers.

In 1993, former session singer Ted Fletcher introduced the "Joemeek" line of audio processing equipment. The tribute to Meek was due to his influence in the early stages of audio compression. The name and product line were sold to the American company PMI Audio Group in 2003. The current product line includes a microphone series called "Telstar", named after Meek's biggest hit.

"The Tea Chest Tapes"
After Meek's death, the thousands of recordings he hid at his studio remained unreleased and preserved by Cliff Cooper of the Millionaires. Subsequent to his suicide in 1967, Cooper is said to have purchased all of Meek's recordings for £300. These recordings were called the "Tea Chest Tapes" among fans, as they were stored in tea chests when Cooper took them out of his flat. Alan Blackburn, former president of the Joe Meek Appreciation Society, catalogued all of them in the mid-1980s.

On 4 September 2008, these unreleased recordings were auctioned in Fame Bureau's 'It's More Than Rock 'N' Roll' auction, where they reportedly sold for £200,000, although, in a 2021 interview for the BBC, Cliff Cooper states that they had failed to sell on that occasion. They contained over 4,000 hours of music on approximately 1,850 tapes, including recordings by David Bowie as singer and sax player with the Konrads, Gene Vincent, Denny Laine, Billy Fury, Tom Jones, Jimmy Page, Mike Berry, John Leyton, Ritchie Blackmore, Jess Conrad, Mitch Mitchell and Screaming Lord Sutch. The tapes also contained many examples of Meek composing songs and experimental sound techniques. Tape 418 has Meek composing songs for the film Live It Up!

On 2 September 2020, Cherry Red Records announced that they had purchased the tapes from Cliff Cooper and would begin the process of digitising the archive with a view to releasing the material, subject to rights clearance.

Artists produced by Meek

Meek passed up the chance to work with the then unknown David Bowie, the Beatles (the latter he once described as "just another bunch of noise, copying other people's music") and Rod Stewart. John Repsch, in The Legendary Joe Meek, recounts that upon hearing Stewart sing, Meek rushed into the studio, put his fingers in his ears and screamed until Stewart had left. He preferred to record instrumentals with the band he sang with – the Moontrekkers.

In 1963 Meek worked with a then little-known singer Tom Jones, then the lead vocalist of Tommy Scott & the Senators. Meek recorded seven tracks with Jones and took them to various labels in an attempt to get a record deal, with no success. Two years later after Jones' worldwide hit "It's Not Unusual" in 1965, Meek was able to sell the tapes he had recorded with Jones to Tower (USA) and Columbia (UK).

Charted singles

The following Meek productions appeared on the British charts.

In popular culture

Biographies
In later years, the interest in Meek's life as well as influence on the music industry, has spawned at least two documentary films, a radio play, a stage play and a feature film.
On 8 February 1991, the BBC showed a 60-minute documentary in its Arena documentary series, entitled The Very Strange Story of... the Legendary Joe Meek. The BBC has since repeated the documentary several times.
On 26 March 1994, BBC Radio 4 broadcast Lonely Joe, a radio play based on the life of Meek, written by Janey Praeger and Peter Kavanagh.
On 2 February 2005, Telstar, a stage play about Meek, written by actors Nick Moran and James Hicks, opened at the Cambridge Arts Theatre and then toured to York, Darlington, Guildford, Eastbourne and Manchester, before opening up at the New Ambassadors Theatre in London on 24 June 2005.
On 12 April 2008, A Life in the Death of Joe Meek, by US filmmakers Howard S. Berger and Susan Stahman, was shown as a work-in-progress at the Sensoria Music & Film Festival in Sheffield. 
On 19 June 2009, a film adaption of Moran's and Hick's play, Telstar: The Joe Meek Story, premiered in London, directed by Nick Moran and with the star of the play, Con O'Neill, continuing his portrayal of Meek.

Tributes and references

A number of artists have made tributes to Meek in various ways:
 Franco-English pop singer-songwriter MeeK chose his stage name as a homage to the British producer.
 British punk Wreckless Eric recounts Meek's life and recreates some of his studio effects in his song "Joe Meek" from the album Donovan of Trash.
 The Marked Men, a Texas punk band, have a song titled "Someday" with lyric: "Joe Meek wanted all the world to know about the news he found."
 The Frank Black song "White Noise Maker" deals with Meek's suicide by shotgun, the white noise maker of the title. "It's been so long since my Telstar."
 Matmos, an Electronic duo, have a song on their 2006 album The Rose Has Teeth in the Mouth of the Beast called "Solo Buttons for Joe Meek".
 In 1995, the record label Razor & Tie released the compilation album It's Hard to Believe It: The Amazing World of Joe Meek, consisting of twenty songs Meek had produced.
 Swing Out Sister include a short instrumental named "Joe Meek's Cat" on their 1997 album Shapes and Patterns, inspired by Meek's 1966 ghost-hunting expeditions to Warley Lea Farm during which he allegedly captured recordings of a talking cat channelling the spirit of a former landowner who committed suicide at the farm.
 Graham Parker's 1992 album Burning Questions includes the cryptic "Just Like Joe Meek's Blues"
 Sheryl Crow claimed that her song "A Change Would Do You Good" was inspired by an article she read about Meek.
 Jonathan King recorded a song about Meek called "He Stood in the Bath He Stamped on the Floor".
 Johnny Stage, Danish producer and guitarist released an album in tribute of Meek, entitled The Lady with the Crying Eyes featuring various Danish artists, on 3 February 2007.
 Dave Stewart (the keyboardist) and Barbara Gaskin recorded the song "Your Lucky Star" dealing with the life and death of Meek, released on the 1991 album "Spin". Dave Stewart also recorded a version of "Telstar" on the occasion of its 40th anniversary in 2002. This was later released on the Dave Stewart and Barbara Gaskin 2009 mini-album "Hour Moon". The album also features the duo's previously released Meek tribute "Your Lucky Star" from their 1991 album "Spin".
 The Spanish label Spicnic released in 2001 a tribute CD, "Oigo un nuevo no mundo. Homenaje a Joe Meek", featuring various Spanish bands.
 Trey Spruance, from the band Mr. Bungle, has stated that the ten-part song/instrumental "The Bends" from their album Disco Volante is inspired by Joe Meek's music. Specifically "I Hear a New World".
 Thomas Truax regularly performed his Meek tribute "Joe Meek Warns Buddy Holly" on his 2008 tours, a song apparently about Meek's supposed warning via spirit-writing predicting Buddy Holly's death. A single and accompanying video was scheduled for release on 3 February 2009, the 50th anniversary of Holly's demise, also the date of Meek's suicide.
 Robb Shenton released "Lonely Joe" as a tribute to the producer on 28 October 2008. Shenton was one of Meek's artists and was with five Meek bands between 1963 and early 1966: The Bobcats, David John and the Mood, the Prestons, the Nashpool and Flip and the Dateliners. He also sang backing vocals with many others.
 In 2004 and 2006 respectively, UK record label Western Star records put together and released two volumes of Meek tributes on CD. These compilations were made up of Western Star artists all paying tribute by recording songs originally recorded or written by Meek. Then in 2012, producer, label boss and long time Meek enthusiast Alan Wilson released "Holloway Road", a song about Meek. This featured on the album Infamy, by his own band The Sharks.
 In 2005, Cane 141 released a B-Side called "Joe Meek Shall Inherit The Earth". The name is a pun on Joe Meek's name and the Bible verse Matthew 5:5 where Jesus (during the Sermon on the Mount) is quoted as saying "Blessed are the meek: for they shall inherit the earth."
 Deadbeat Poets recorded "Staircase Stomp" in 2010; the title is a reference to the Honeycombs song "Have I the Right?", and the song has many references to Meek.

References

Bibliography

Further reading
 John Repsch: The Legendary Joe Meek (UK; 1989, July 2003) 
 Barry Cleveland: Creative Music Production – Joe Meek's BOLD Techniques (USA; July 2001) 
 Barry Cleveland: Joe Meek's BOLD Techniques, 2nd Edition (USA; December 2013) 
 The penultimate chapter of Alan Moore's spoken word piece "The Highbury Working" concerns Meek's last moments.
 Mallory Curley: Beatle Pete, Time Traveller (Randy Press, 2005)                                                                                                                                                                                                                 * Jon Savage: "Meek by name, wild by nature" (The Guardian, UK, 12 November 2006.)

External links

BBC Music Profile: Joe Meek

1929 births
1967 deaths
1967 murders in the United Kingdom
1967 suicides
20th-century English criminals
Burials in Gloucestershire
Crime in London
Criminals from Gloucestershire
Deaths by firearm in London
English audio engineers
English male criminals
English record producers
English songwriters
English gay musicians
Ivor Novello Award winners
LGBT producers
Male murderers
Murder–suicides in the United Kingdom
Musicians from Gloucestershire
People from Newent
People convicted for homosexuality in the United Kingdom
People with bipolar disorder
People with schizophrenia
RPM Records (United States) artists
Suicides by firearm in England
Royal Air Force airmen
20th-century Royal Air Force personnel
20th-century English LGBT people